Tanana may refer to:

Places
 Tanana, Alaska, United States, a city
 Tanana River, Alaska
 Tanana Valley, Alaska

Other uses
 Tanana or Lower Tanana language, an endangered language spoken in Alaska
 Tanana (soil), the official soil of Alaska
 Frank Tanana (born 1953), American former baseball pitcher

See also
 Upper Tanana language